Presqu'île-Robillard Ecological Reserve is an ecological reserve in Quebec, Canada. It was established on May 17, 2000.

References

External links
 Official website from Government of Québec

Protected areas of Laurentides
Nature reserves in Quebec
Protected areas established in 2000
2000 establishments in Quebec